Arthur Ian Lavender (born 16 February 1946) is an English stage, film and television actor. He is best known for his role as Private Pike in the BBC sitcom  Dad's Army, and is the last surviving major cast member of the series following the death of Frank Williams in 2022.

Early life
Lavender was born in Birmingham, England. He attended Bournville Boys Technical School (later Bournville Grammar-Technical School for Boys) where he appeared in many school dramatic productions. From there he went to the Bristol Old Vic Theatre School, with the assistance of a grant from the City of Birmingham. Following his graduation in 1967 he appeared on stage in Canterbury.

Career
His first television appearance was as the lead in a Rediffusion play entitled Half Hour Story: Flowers at my Feet in 1968.

Dad's Army
In 1968, aged 22, Lavender was cast as Private Frank Pike, the youngest member and “stupid boy” of the platoon in the BBC sitcom Dad's Army. This made him a household name and gave him the great advantage of working alongside a number of experienced actors during his formative years, helping him to hone his acting skills.   He appeared in the entire run of the series, and in the spinoff film released in 1971. He appeared in 1974 in one episode of Man About the House (While The Cat's Away) as Mark, an aspiring actor consumed by his own vanity. He reprised the part of Pike in the BBC Radio sitcom It Sticks Out Half a Mile. The sitcom was a radio sequel to Dad's Army, but ran for only one series. Lavender has continued to be associated with Dad's Army, and still takes part in occasional fan conventions and cast reunions. He made a variety of appearances during 2008 in connection with the 40th anniversary of the series. These included a reunion with surviving cast members in July, 2008, and an appearance on BBC1's Jonathan Ross Salutes Dad's Army in August.

Lavender also recorded a special introduction for the 'lost' colour episode of Dad's Army entitled "Room at the Bottom" which was broadcast on 13 December 2008. In 2014 Lavender appeared at the Edinburgh Festival Fringe in a show with Steven Mcnicoll entitled Don't tell him, Pike!, where Lavender talked about his time on Dad's Army and the subsequent effect it had on his career.

He made a cameo appearance as Brigadier Pritchard in the 2016 Dad's Army film, providing a link with the original series.

After Dad's Army
After Dad's Army, Lavender returned to the theatre, including a role in a production of Shakespeare's The Merchant of Venice starring Dustin Hoffman. Between 1971 and 1973 Lavender joined Dad's Army colleague Arthur Lowe on the BBC radio comedy Parsley Sidings. From 1982 to 1983, he was in the BBC radio comedy series, a spin-off from Dad's Army called It Sticks Out Half a Mile.  Lavender also appeared in films and television series, one of which (Mr Big, 1977) featured him starring alongside Peter Jones and Prunella Scales. During the 1970s he appeared as a supporting actor in a number of British 'low farce' films, including one Carry On film – Carry On Behind (1975).

He was reunited with producer David Croft for the television series Come Back Mrs. Noah (1977–78, co-written by Croft with Jeremy Lloyd), though it was unsuccessful. A revival of The Glums (1978–79), at first as part of a Bruce Forsyth variety series, proved rather more satisfactory, being adapted from scripts for the 1950s radio series Take It From Here that were written by Frank Muir and Denis Norden.

Lavender then appeared in several other TV comedy shows during the 1980s, including two episodes of Yes Minister, as Richard Cartwright, and a lead role in the short-lived The Hello Goodbye Man (1984), as the inept salesman Denis Ailing. He also appeared on ITV's television game show Cluedo (1990), based on the board game. During the 1990s Lavender continued to appear occasionally in television comedy roles including a bit-part as a burglar alarm salesman in the BBC sitcom Keeping Up Appearances. He made an appearance in Goodnight Sweetheart as two different parallel universe versions of the time-travelling lead character's son Michael. He also provided the lead voice of BBC children's animation PC Pinkerton in 1988.

In 2001 Lavender joined the BBC soap opera EastEnders, playing the role of Derek Harkinson, a gay friend of Pauline Fowler. He continued in EastEnders for four years, with storylines mainly involving the Fowler family, before leaving the serial in 2005. On 4 November 2016, it was announced that Lavender would make a brief return to the show.

Lavender then toured with The Rocky Horror Show musical, playing the Narrator. He also played the part of a patient in the 5 May 2007 episode of Casualty on BBC. In late 2007, he toured in the comedy play Donkey's Years. In May 2008, Lavender appeared in the BBC documentary series Comedy Map of Britain. He also appeared on BBC One's The One Show on Thursday 31 July 2008.

Over Christmas 2008, Lavender appeared in Celebrity Mastermind on BBC One. As presenter John Humphrys asked his name, fellow contestant Rick Wakeman shouted 'Don't tell him, Pike!', a reference to Captain Mainwaring's most famous line from Dad's Army. At the start of 2009, Lavender appeared as a guest character in an episode of the CBBC sitcom, The Legend of Dick and Dom. Lavender starred in the film, 31 North 62 East (released September 2009), an independent psychological thriller starring John Rhys-Davies, Marina Sirtis, Heather Peace and Craig Fairbrass.

Lavender appeared as Monsignor Howard in the West End theatre production of Sister Act the Musical. The musical opened at the London Palladium on 2 June 2009, and ran through to October 2010. In January 2011, Lavender appeared at the Slapstick Silent Comedy Festival in Bristol. Lavender introduced Sherlock Jr., a 1924 silent film directed by and starring Buster Keaton.

In early 2013, Lavender appeared as The Mikado in three concert performances of the Gilbert and Sullivan opera, taking place in The Royal Festival Hall, London, the Symphony Hall, Birmingham and the Bridgewater Hall, Manchester. In August 2013 he made his Edinburgh Fringe debut in a stage version of The Shawshank Redemption.

In November 2014, Lavender made a cameo appearance in the film remake Dad's Army directed by Oliver Parker,  released in February 2016. In February 2015 he was a recipient of one of The Oldie magazine's "Oldie of the Year Awards" – specifically the "Stupid Oldie Boy of the Year".

On 9 May 2015 Lavender gave a reading at VE Day 70: A Party to Remember in Horse Guards Parade, London that was broadcast live on BBC1.

In 2017, Lavender appeared  alongside Rula Lenska, Johnny Ball, Judith Chalmers and Diana Moran in the reality show A Celebrity Taste Of Italy Channel 5. During filming he fell ill with sepsis and spent some time in an Italian hospital before returning to the UK to recuperate.

In 2019, Lavender appeared alongside Maureen Beattie, Jonathan Harden, Helen Vine and Rosin Rae in the mental health radio monologue series Talking Taboos, produced by Vine. Lavender's piece, "Portrait", was written by Anthony Cule, directed by Fiona McAlpine, and explored the memories of a man who had experienced a number of relationships with different alcoholics throughout his lifetime.

Personal life
Lavender was first married to actress Suzanne Kerchiss. He married his second wife, American-born Miki Hardy, three years his senior, six days after his bladder cancer was diagnosed in 1993. Lavender said "We had been living together for 16 years and it was something I should have done a long time before, these things change you, they help you to see what is important in life." The bladder tumour was operated on successfully, and though Lavender has regular check-ups, doctors are confident the cancer will not return. Lavender also survived a heart attack in the summer of 2004.

Lavender grew up supporting Aston Villa.  When filming began on Dad's Army, he was allowed to choose Pike's scarf from an array in the BBC wardrobe. He chose a claret and blue scarf to remind him of his home city. He is a big cricket fan. On 22 June 2015, Lavender was awarded a star on the Birmingham Walk of Stars.

Filmography

Film

Television

Radio
 "Rookery Nook (play)", BBC Radio 4, Saturday Night Theatre, Saturday 24 August 1985 - Gerald Popkiss

References

External links
 
 

1946 births
Living people
Alumni of Bristol Old Vic Theatre School
British male comedy actors
English male soap opera actors
English male stage actors
Male actors from Birmingham, West Midlands
People from Birmingham, West Midlands